BLACKsummers'night Tour is a tour by American R&B singer Maxwell. The tour was in support of his platinum hit album BLACKsummers'night. The trek kicked off on June 17, 2009, in Grand Rapids, Michigan throughout North America. The tour continued during the fall with a second U.S. run in September, and additional dates added throughout Europe, his first tour there in 11 years.

Background
Before the release of Maxwell's anticipated album BLACKsummers'night released on July 7, 2009 the singer embarked on a summer tour that kicked off in North America on June 17, that ended on August 2, in New York. Following the summer U.S. leg, he added dates for the fall outing starting Sept 2, at the House of Blues in Boston, Massachusetts that included supporting acts R&B singer Chrisette Michele and hiphop artist Common joining him on Sept. 25 in Toronto. 
Maxwell kicked off a European tour on oct 28, in Birmingham, UK with a final run ending on November 13, at London' s o2 Academy Brixton.

Opening Acts

 Laura Izibor (USA—Leg 1)
 Chrisette Michele (USA—Leg 2)
 Common (USA—Leg 2)

Set list
"Phoenix Rise"
"Dance wit Me"
"Sumthin' Sumthin'"
"Get to Know Ya"1
"Lifetime"
"Bad Habits"
"Lovin' You"
"Simply Beautiful" (Al Green song)
"Fortunate"
"Everwanting: To Want You to Want"1
"Gravity: Pushing to Pull"2
"Help Somebody"
"Fistful of Tears"
"Cold"
"No One"
"Playing Possum"2
"This Woman's Work"
"Stop the World"
". . . Til the Cops Come Knockin'"
"Pretty Wings"
"Ascension (Don't Ever Wonder)"
"Whenever, Wherever, Whatever"

1 performed only on select dates in the US and Europe2 performed on dates in the USA

Band
Keyboards/Piano: Robert Glasper
Guitar: Hod David, Derrick Hodge
Bass: Sean Michael Ray
Percussions: Timbali Cornwell
Drums: Chris Dave, Spanky Mc Curdy
Trombone: Saunders Sermon
Saxophone: Kenneth Wahlum III
Organ: Shedrick Mitchell
Trumpet: Keyon Harrold
Background vocals: Latina Webb, Keyon Harrold, Saunders Sermon, Kenneth Wahlum III

Tour dates

References

External links
 www.musze.com

Maxwell (musician) concert tours
2009 concert tours